The following lists events that happened during 2014 in Fiji.

Incumbents
President: Frank Bainimarama 
Prime Minister: Frank Bainimarama

Events

March
 March 12 - Fiji's Health Department confirms that eleven people have died and over 10,000 people have been infected in an outbreak of the type three strain of dengue fever.

July
 July 3 - The government of Tonga reveals a proposal to trade the disputed Minerva Reefs to Fiji in exchange for the Lau Islands, in an effort to settle a decades-old territorial dispute between the two Pacific countries.

September
 September 17 - Voters in Fiji go to the polls for the first election since a coup in 2006, with coup leader Voreqe Bainimarama's FijiFirst Party achieving almost 60 per cent of the vote.
 September 22 - The Fiji First Party led by Voreqe Bainimarama wins 32 out of 50 seats in the Parliament in last week's general election.

October
 October 31 - Australia and the United States lift sanctions against Fiji following recent democratic elections.

References

 
Years of the 21st century in Fiji
2010s in Fiji
Fiji
Fiji